Transtillaspis mindoana is a species of moth of the family Tortricidae. It is found in Pichincha Province, Ecuador.

The wingspan is 15–16 mm for males and 18 mm for females. The ground colour of the forewings is dirty ferruginous with darker groups of scales and brownish black strigulae (fine streaks), spots and suffusions. The hindwings are pale brownish creamy, tinged with ferruginous in the apex area.

Etymology
The species name refers to Mindo, famous for its rich bird fauna and nearby to the type locality.

References

Moths described in 2005
Transtillaspis
Moths of South America
Taxa named by Józef Razowski